Niklas Hedl (born 17 March 2001) is an Austrian professional footballer who plays as a goalkeeper for Austrian Bundesliga club Rapid Wien and the Austria national team.

Career
Hedl is a youth product of Rapid Wien's youth academy. He began his professional career with their reserves in 2020, before debuting for their senior team in a 2–2 Austrian Football Bundesliga tie with Sturm Graz on 20 February 2022.

International career
Hedl is a youth international for Austria, having represented the Austria U21s.

Personal life
Hedl's father, Raimund, was also a football goalkeeper and is currently the goalkeeper coach at Rapid Wien. His brother, Tobias, is a football forward and member of Rapid Wien's reserves.

Career statistics

Club

International

References

External links
 
 OEFB Profile

2001 births
Living people
Footballers from Vienna
Austrian footballers
Austria under-21 international footballers
SK Rapid Wien players
Austrian Football Bundesliga players
2. Liga (Austria) players
Austrian Regionalliga players
Association football goalkeepers